Our Lady of Mount Carmel Church, formally known as the Basilica of the National Shrine of Our Lady of Mount Carmel, is a Roman Catholic minor basilica and national shrine located in Barangay Mariana, Quezon City, Metro Manila in the Philippines. Dedicated to Our Lady of Mount Carmel, the church was built by the Carmelites from 1954 to 1964. It was declared a parish in 1975, and a national shrine in 2015. In 2019, it was declared a minor basilica, making it the fifteenth minor basilica in the country.

The church celebrates its liturgical feast every July 16. It is under the jurisdiction of the Diocese of Cubao.

History
The devotion of the Filipinos to Our Lady of Mount Carmel started in the 1600s when the Augustinian Recollects received an image of Our Lady of Mount Carmel from the Carmelites in New Spain (present-day Mexico).

In 1923, a group of four Carmelite nuns arrived in the Philippines, and they set up a convent in Jaro, Iloilo City. The Carmelite fathers followed in 1947, focusing their missionary work in a part of Quezon province (present-day Aurora). In 1952, during a meeting with Apostolic Nuncio to the Philippines Archbishop Egidio Vagnozzi and the Prior General of the Carmelite Order, Archbishop Vagnozzi asked for more Carmelites to be sent to the country to establish a monastery and church in Manila.

In response to Vagnozzi's request, a group of Irish Carmelite friars sent to the Philippines initially considered building at either Horseshoe Drive or Gregorio Araneta Avenue, both in Quezon City. However, in 1954, the Carmelites decided to build it at a lot along Broadway Avenue. The land where the basilica stands today was a cogon field that was part of the original estate owned by Magdalena Hemady, the balae or in-law of then-senator Claro M. Recto.

During the 1950s, residents of New Manila would eagerly walk to attend Mass at the nearby Immaculate Conception Cathedral in Cubao, which served as the parish church of New Manila. Other residents would also attend mass at the Christ the King Mission Seminary along E. Rodriguez Sr. Avenue or at the Carmelite Convent along Gilmore Avenue. But other residents would also walk or drive as far as the Santa Mesa Parish (now Sacred Heart of Jesus Parish) in Santa Mesa, Manila or the Santo Domingo Church further north.

The cornerstone of the Mount Carmel Parish was blessed on December 30, 1954. It took a decade for the church to be completed, with the inauguration taking place on July 16, 1964, the feast day of Our Lady of Mount Carmel, with Manila Archbishop Rufino Cardinal Santos leading the inauguration.

The church later became a popular location for wedding scenes in the movies. It also became a popular church for actual wedding ceremonies; this is attributed to the lower fees charged at the shrine compared to other churches and the long aisle walk favored by many brides.

On February 17, 1975, the church was established as a parish by Manila Archbishop Jaime Cardinal Sin.

National shrine and minor basilica status
From 2015 to 2016, the altar was renovated. Its interior has also been coated with paint for the first time since it was built in 1954. On December 14, 2015, the parish was solemnly declared a national shrine during a solemn Mass presided by Lingayen–Dagupan Archbishop and then-Catholic Bishops' Conference of the Philippines President Socrates Villegas.

On November 30, 2018, the Holy See approved the petition from the Diocese of Cubao to elevate the shrine to a minor basilica. On March 25, 2019, on the Feast of the Annunciation, it was officially declared a minor basilica during a Mass presided by Cubao Bishop Honesto Ongtioco. The first church in the diocese to be granted such status, it has also been affiliated with the Papal Basilica of Saint Mary Major in Rome, making it also the first church in the diocese to have such.

On May 13, 2020, Pope Francis approved the canonical coronation of the Our Lady of Mount Carmel image enshrined at the basilica, although the Diocese of Cubao did not announce it until July 9. The image was canonically crowned on August 15, the Feast of the Assumption of Mary.

Shrine details
Built in the Modernist style in a cruciform layout, the shrine is located on a  lot along Broadway Avenue in between 4th and 5th streets. Behind the church is the St. John of the Cross Seminary.

Aside from the main altar, the church has two side altars. Since 2019, a medallion bearing the papal arms has been placed above the side altar of Our Lady of Mount Carmel – signifying its status as a minor basilica. It also has three air-conditioned mortuary chapels with a capacity of 50 to 150 seats.

Parish priests
Fr. Paul O’Sullivan,  (1975–1978)
Fr. Tom Shanahan,  (1978–1981)
Fr. Rolando Tria-Tirona,  (1981–1984)
Fr. Paul Sullivan,  (1984–1987)
Fr. Michael Fitzgerald,  (1987–1988)
Fr. Paul O’Sullivan,  (1988–1990)
Fr. Rolando Tria-Tirona,  (1990–1993)
Fr. Angelo Madelo,  (1993–1996)
Fr. Alex Collera,  (1996–1999)
Fr. Mariano Agruda,  (1999–2005)
Fr. Paulo Gamboa,  (2005–2006)
Fr. Arnie Boehme,  (2006–2008)
Fr. Alex Collera,  (2008–2011)
Fr. Dan Lim,  (2011–2014)
Fr. Joey Mabborang,  (2014–present)

See also
San Sebastian Church (Manila)
Our Lady of Mount Carmel
List of Catholic basilicas
Roman Catholic Diocese of Cubao
List of Roman Catholic churches in Metro Manila
Catholic Church in the Philippines

References

External links

Official website

Roman Catholic national shrines in the Philippines
Basilica churches in the Philippines
Roman Catholic churches completed in 1964
20th-century Roman Catholic church buildings in the Philippines
Churches in the Roman Catholic Diocese of Cubao
Roman Catholic churches in Quezon City